Kissing Game is a Brazilian thriller drama streaming television series created by Esmir Filho for Netflix.

Plot
After a party, a girl wakes up the next day with a slightly different hangover. She was infected with a virus transmitted through her mouth. In addition to the common dramas from the coming of age, teenagers in a rural town live with the panic of the virus and the fear that their secrets will be discovered.

Cast

Main

Episodes

Release
On June 23, 2020, Netflix released the official trailer for the series.

References

External links
 
 

2020s Brazilian television series
2020 Brazilian television series debuts
Brazilian drama television series
Brazilian thriller television series
Brazilian mystery television series
Portuguese-language Netflix original programming
Brazilian LGBT-related television shows
LGBT-related web series
Television series about teenagers
Television shows filmed in Goiás